Parkside Halt was a railway station located between Ulbster and Lybster, Highland.

History 
The station was opened on the Wick and Lybster Railway by the LMS in 1938. As with the other stations on the line, the station was closed from 3 April 1944.

References

Notes

Sources 
 
 
 

Disused railway stations in Caithness
Railway stations in Great Britain opened in 1938
Railway stations in Great Britain closed in 1944
Former London, Midland and Scottish Railway stations